Wing Commander Padmanabha Gautam, MVC & Bar, VM (23 July 1933 – 25 November 1972) was an officer in the Indian Air Force. He was awarded the India's second-highest war-time gallantry award, the Maha Vir Chakra twice. Awarded during the Indo-Pakistani War of 1965 and the Indo-Pakistani War of 1971, Gautam is one of only six officers to have been decorated with the Maha Vir Chakra twice.

Early life and education
Gautam was born on 23 July 1933 in Chennai, Tamil Nadu to Neelkanta Padmanabha.

Military career
Gautam was commissioned into the Indian Air Force on 1 April 1953. In 1961, he served as a Flight Lieutenant which as deployed in Congo and was awarded the Vayu Sena Medal for his service. On 25 November 1972, he died in an air-crash due to internal bleeding. The engine of his MIG-21FL flamed shortly after take-off and he was forced to crash land.

Maha Vir Chakra
The citation for the first Maha Vir Chakra awarded to him reads:

The citation for the second Maha Vir Chakra awarded to him reads:

References 

1933 births
1972 deaths
Indian Air Force officers
Indian military personnel of the Indo-Pakistani War of 1971
Recipients of the Maha Vir Chakra
Recipients of the Vayu Sena Medal